Knights of Liberty may refer to:

 Knights of Liberty (anti-slavery), a secret society created by Moses Dickson in 1846
 Knights of Liberty, a name used by a group of violent masked vigilantes in the Tulsa Outrage in 1917 in Oklahoma, possibly as a "false flag" name.